Alberto Pedro Demicheli Lizaso (August 7, 1896 – October 12, 1980) was a Uruguayan political figure. Demicheli was a de facto President  of Uruguay in 1976 as a non-democratically elected authority of the civic-military dictatorship.

Background 
He was a noted jurist and economist and previously served as interior minister under President Gabriel Terra.

A member of the Colorado Party, Demicheli was one of a number of civilians who participated in the civilian-military administration which took office following President Juan Maria Bordaberry's coup in 1973.

President of Uruguay 
He succeeded Bordaberry as President in July 1976. Aged 80 by the end of his brief period as President, he was the oldest ever president of Uruguay. While in office he adopted measures designed to liberalize the economy.

Demicheli was a relative moderate within the civilian-military administrations which ruled Uruguay between 1973 and 1985, in that, although he was known for measures deemed repressive by democracy advocates opposed to the government, he dissented with his military colleagues regarding the extent to which former political figures should be proscribed from pursuing political activities: this is believed to have hastened the end of his short term of office as President of Uruguay.

Demicheli handed over his Presidential office to Aparicio Méndez in September 1976, who was still serving as President when Demicheli died in 1980.

Historical background 
As with his predecessor Juan Maria Bordaberry, some observers would argue that the close links between leading Colorado party figures such as Demicheli and the military mirror the similar elements present in the Colorado party's founder, the 19th century President and military patriot, Fructuoso Rivera. The preference for rule by decree of nineteenth century Colorado President of Uruguay Venancio Flores would also be a historical case in point, according to this argument. Others would reason that Demicheli was morally repudiating Colorado party ideals in cooperating with the civilian-military administration which took office in 1973.

The fact that the Colorado Demicheli twice in his career exercised ministerial / executive powers at periods when rule by decree was in force arguably illustrates the fact that within the Colorado party there was substantial support for such measures.  The tendency of some observers to describe Latin American heads of state who ruled by decree as 'de facto' Presidents may be seen in this light. Others would seek to discount Demicheli's association with the Colorado Party.

Spouse 
His wife, Sofía Álvarez Vignoli de Demicheli, was noted for her diplomatic activity during the Presidency of Gabriel Terra, in whose administration Alberto Demicheli also served.

See also 
 Politics of Uruguay
 List of political families#Uruguay

External links 
 https://web.archive.org/web/20070927003421/http://www.bcu.gub.uy/autoriza/peiees/iees03j3110701.pdf

(picture:)
 https://web.archive.org/web/20070314012341/http://www.martin.romano.org/wp16/wp16_445.htm
 See also :es:Alberto Demicheli (similar Wikipedia article in Spanish)

1896 births
1980 deaths
People from Rocha, Uruguay
University of the Republic (Uruguay) alumni
Uruguayan jurists
Colorado Party (Uruguay) politicians
Presidents of Uruguay
Interior ministers of Uruguay
Uruguayan football chairmen and investors
Civic-military dictatorship of Uruguay
Uruguayan anti-communists